Makuana Chak 229 RB (Urdu, چک نمبر 229 ر ب مکوانہ ) on Faisalabad–Jaranwala Road at Faisalabad ring road bypass is Town of Jaranwala Tehsil District Faisalabad Pakistan.
Makuana has high school for boys and girls. Now Faisalabad city area reaches up to Makuana.

Education 

There are many educational institutes in Makuana. Some main schools included:
Al-Bahadur Public High School
Al-Shahbaz Public High School
Tariq Pilot High School
Jamia Manzoor-ul-Quran

References

Cities and towns in Faisalabad District